M. Lothaire is the pseudonym of a group of mathematicians, many of whom were students of Marcel-Paul Schützenberger. The name is used as the author of several of their joint books about  combinatorics on words. The group is named for Lothair I.

Members 
Mathematicians in the group have included 
Jean-Paul Allouche,
Jean Berstel,
Valérie Berthé,
Véronique Bruyère,
Julien Cassaigne,
Christian Choffrut,
Robert Cori,
Maxime Crochemore
Jacques Desarmenien,
Volker Diekert,
Dominique Foata,
Christiane Frougny,
Guo-Niu Han,
Tero Harju,
Philippe Jacquet,
Juhani Karhumäki,
Roman Kolpakov,
Gregory Koucherov,
Eric Laporte,
Alain Lascoux,
Bernard Leclerc,
Aldo De Luca,
Filippo Mignosi,
Mehryar Mohri,
Dominique Perrin,
Jean-Éric Pin,
Giuseppe Pirillo,
Nadia Pisanti,
Wojciech Plandowski,
Dominique Poulalhon,
Gesine Reinert,
Antonio Restivo,
Christophe Reutenauer,
Marie-France Sagot,
Jacques Sakarovitch,
Gilles Schaeffer,
Sophie Schbath,
Marcel-Paul Schützenberger,
Patrice Séébold,
Imre Simon,
Wojciech Szpankowski,
Jean-Yves Thibon,
Stefano Varricchio,
and Michael Waterman.

See also

Séminaire Lotharingien de Combinatoire

Publications

References

External links
Lothaire's books

Combinatorics
Lothaire, M.
Lothaire, M.
Lothaire, M.